Golden Heights may refer to:
 Golden Heights, Alberta, a locality in the Sturgeon County near Edmonton
 Golden Heights, Florida, a neighborhood in the City of Fort Lauderdale
 Golden Heights, South Australia, a locality west of Waikerie in the Riverland

See also
Golan Heights